Policewala Gunda (Hindi: पुलिसवाला गुण्डा) is a 1995 Indian Hindi-language crime film, which stars Dharmendra, Reena Roy in lead roles. The film turned out to be unsuccessful.

Plot
This movie revolves around a policeman (Mukesh Khanna), who is a kind and honorable person. After arresting the henchmen of a notorious crime leader, Kaalishankar Peeli Topiwaley (Ranjeet), the crime lord sets out to kill the policeman with the minister (Mohan Joshi). His wife (Deepti Naval) becomes depressed. She is helped by a policeman Ajit Singh (Dharmendra), who, after listening to the full story, vows to take revenge on Kaalishankar Peeli Topiwaley, Lala (Surendra Pal), Don and the minister (Mohan Joshi).

Cast 

Dharmendra as ACP Ajit Singh
Reena Roy as Sudha Singh
Sudesh Berry as Vikram Singh
Jay Mehta as Jai Singh
Mamta Kulkarni as Renu 
Shikha Swaroop as Mona Singh
Mukesh Khanna as Inspector Ranveer Chauhan
Deepti Naval as Mrs. Chauhan  
Jagdeep as Mamu
Mohan Joshi as Chief Minister Shambhunath
Sharat Saxena as Police Commissioner
Viju Khote as Jailor Shamsher Singh Kallu
Pradeep Rawat as Jailor Patania
Ajit Vachani as Constable / Inspector Nihal Singh
Brahmachari as Police constable R.K.Kadam
Naresh Suri as Police Inspector Mahendra Singh
Ram Sethi as Damodar 
Ishrat Ali as Narayandas
Girija Shankar as Don Kailashnath Narang
Ranjeet as Kalishankar
Arun Bali as Central Government Minister
Achyut Potdar as Mehra, Intelligent chief
Seema Deo as Mother of Ajit Singh, Cameo Role ,Photo in Photoframe
Gurbachan Singh as Goon of Kalishankar
Disco Shanti as Gulabo

Soundtrack
Music: Bappi Lahiri
Lyrics: Maya Govind

Track list

External links

1990s crime action films
1995 films
Indian crime action films
1990s Hindi-language films
Films scored by Bappi Lahiri